This is a list of sculptors who were born or whose creative production is associated with Denmark:

A
 Gunnar Aagaard Andersen (1919–1982), concrete art movement
 Carl Aarsleff (1852–1918), statues and statuettes
 Daniel Andersen (1885–1959), also a composer
 Henrik B. Andersen (born 1958), abstract yet recognizable works, professor
 Rasmus Andersen, (1861–1930), naturalistic portraits

B
 Claus Berg (c. 1470 – c. 1532), Odense cathedral altarpiece
 Ejler Bille (1910–2004), small sculptures, painting
 Herman Wilhelm Bissen (1798–1868), Landsoldaten in Fredericia 
 Vilhelm Bissen (1836–1913), Absalon on Højbro Plads
 Johannes Bjerg (1886–1955), El Greco inspired statues
 Thyra Boldsen (1884–1968), naturalistic sculptor, successful in California  
 Carl Johan Bonnesen (1868–1933), statues and statuettes  
 Peter Brandes (born 1944), abstract art
 Ib Braase (1923–2009), left Denmark to work in France with unconventional materials
 Hans Brüggemann (c. 1480 – c. 1521), Bordesholm Altar, Schleswig Cathedral
 Anders Bundgaard (1864–1937), Gefion Fountain, Copenhagen

C
 Anne Marie Carl-Nielsen (1863–1945), naturalistic figures of animals and people
 Caius Gabriel Cibber (1630–1700), statues in London
 Louis August le Clerc (1688–1771), Rococo decoration, Christiansborg
 Ingvar Cronhammar (1947–2021), monumental public art

D
 Jens Peter Dahl-Jensen (1874–1960), animal figurines
 Adam van Düren (c. 1487 – c. 1532), Linköping Cathedral

E
 Torben Ebbesen (born 1945), installations with contrasting materials 
 Friederich Ehbisch (1672–1748), stucco in Rosenborg and Fredensborg Castles
 Gottfred Eickhoff (1902–1982), French-inspired bronze female figures
 Olafur Eliasson (born 1967), large-scale installations
 Edvard Eriksen (1876–1959), Little Mermaid, Copenhagen

F
 Sonja Ferlov Mancoba (1911–1984), avant-garde sculptor
 Adam Fischer (1888–1968), Cubist figures
 Jacob Fortling (1711–1761), staircases in various palaces
 Wilhelm Freddie (1909–1995), realism, abstract art
 Hermann Ernst Freund (1786–1840), Nordic mythology

G
 Paul Gadegaard (1920–1992), designed factory furnishings to complement his artwork
 Jens Galschiøt (born 1954), main bronze public sculptures
 Jean René Gauguin (1881–1961), bronze castings of athletes and dancers
 Ib Geertsen (1919–2009), mobiles and hanging art 
 Johannes Gelert (1852–1923), public art in the United States
 Jørgen Gudmundsen-Holmgreen (1985–1966), busts inspired by classical Greek sculpture

H
 Aksel Hansen (1853–1933), Echo, Rosenborg Castle Gardens 
 Karl Hansen Reistrup (1863–1929), ceramics from Kähler's workshop in Næstved 
 Rasmus Harboe (1868–1952), Hercules Fountain, Vesterbros Torv
 Carl Hartmann (1837–1901), worked with antique motifs in the Thorvaldsen tradition
 Louis Hasselriis (1844–1912), public statues of national heroes
 Arne Haugen Sørensen (born 1932), church decoration in a variety of art forms 
 Jørgen Haugen Sørensen (born 1934), figurative bronzes, large angular works
 Hein Heinsen (born 1935), minimalism
 Gerhard Henning (1880–1967), statues of the female form
 Louise Hindsgavl (born 1973), sculptor
 Hans Holst (1619, died after 1640), woodcarver
 Horder (12th century), baptismal fonts
 Knud Hvidberg (1927–1986), Constructivist works inspired by Linien II

I

J
 Niels Hansen Jacobsen (1861–1941), Troll that smells Christian blood
 Robert Jacobsen (1912–1993), sculpture part at Tørskind Gravel Pit 
 Georg Jensen (1866–1935), Art Nouveau silversmith
 Søren Georg Jensen (1917–1982), silversmith and sculptor 
 Steen Krarup Jensen (born 1950), experimental work, mobiles and assemblages
 Jens Adolf Jerichau (1816–1883), dynamic naturalistic figures including Penelope
 Asger Jorn (1914–1973), versatile artist, founded avant-garde COBRA, over 2,500 works  
 Lorentz Jørgensen (1644, died after 1681), woodcarver

K
 Per Kirkeby (born 1938), experimental eks-skolen works, widely exhibited
 Elle Klarskov Jørgensen (born 1958), installations 
 Eigil Knuth (1903–1996), Inuit busts
 Dorthe Kristoffersen (1906–1976), Greenlandic sculptor of small mythological figures
 K'itura Kristoffersen (born 1939), Greenlandic sculptor
 Sara Kristoffersen (1937–2008), Greenlandic sculptor

L
 Jørn Larsen (1926–2004), member of Grønningen, sculptures in marble, granite, steel
 Christian Lemmerz (born 1959), German-born sculptor, illustrator and performance artist
 Jan Leth (1932–2010), abstract monumental works
 Kirsten Lockenwitz (born 1932), abstract works often in unconventional materials including neon tubes
 Agnes Lunn (1850–1941), animals including horses and cows
Sigrid Lütken (1915–2008), sculptor focusing on abstract works depicting plants, animals and people

M
 Julie Marstrand (1882–1943), sculptor, textile artist and writer
 Harvey Martin (1942–2014), smith and sculptor, public works in iron and steel
 Egon Møller-Nielsen (1915–1959), abstract surrealistic works
 Brix Michgell (early 17th century), sculptor, woodworker
 Mogens Møller (1934–2021), Minimalist sculptor, large public works

N
 Knud Nellemose (1908–1997), sportsmen, famous Danes
 Kai Nielsen (1882–1924), rounded female forms, works on Blågårds Plads
 Astrid Noack (1888–1954), specialized in the human figure
 Bjørn Nørgaard (born 1947), critical works, various materials, monumental public sculptures

O
Tove Ólafsson (1909–1992), sculptor
 Henrik Olrik (1830–1890), designs for tableware
 Hans Pauli Olsen (born 1957), public works in Tórshavn
 John Olsen (born 1938), works based on birds and animals in natural materials
 Willy Ørskov (1920–1990), plastics and inflatable materials
 Kirsten Ortwed (born 1948), striking sculptures in public places

P
 Carl-Henning Pedersen (1913–2007), monumental art
 Hans Peder Pedersen-Dan (1859–1939), granite elephants, Carlsberg Brewery 
Johanne Pedersen-Dan (1860–1934), sculptor
Nielsine Petersen (1851–1916), sculptor, bronze statues
 Johann Christoph Petzold (1708–1762), Neptune and Mercury at Børsen
 Axel Poulsen (1887–1972), large public memorials

Q
 Thomas Quellinus (1661–1709), baroque works in churches and memorial chapels

R
 Arne Ranslet (born 1931), grotesque animal sculptures and monumental bronze works
 Svend Rathsack (1885–1941), Maritime Monument on Copenhagen's waterfront, Lumbye monument in Tivoli
 Lise Ring (born 1936), sculptures of women, children and animals

S
 August Saabye (1823–1916), small elaborate bronzes, Hans Christian Andersen statue in Rosenborg Castle Gardens
 Jacques Saly (1717–1776), equestrian statue of Frederik V at Amalienborg (1846–1922), 
 Stephan Sinding (1846–1922), symbolic works including Valkyrien
 Niels Skovgaard (1858–1938), statue of N.F.S. Grundtvig
 Povl Søndergaard (1905–1986), simply crafted bronze or granite works  
 Carl Frederik Stanley (c. 1738–1813), Neo-classical monuments and decorative work 
 Simon Carl Stanley (1703–1761), numerous marble statues including Venus, Adonis and Cupid in Fredensborg 
 Henrik Starcke (1899–1973), fanciful creatures 
 Hans van Steenwinckel the Younger (1587–1639), sculptural works for Kronborg and Frederiksborg 
 Hans van Steenwinckel the Youngest (1639–1700), sepulchral chapel in St Peter's, Copenhagen 
 Theobald Stein (1829–1901), Ludvig Holberg statue outside the Royal Danish Theatre
 Morten Stræde (born 1956), organic and geometric works
 Leif Sylvester Petersen (born 1940), art in public spaces

T
 Rudolph Tegner (1873–1950), Symbolism, controversial monument to Niels Finsen
 Erik Thommesen (1916–2008), Expressionist representations of the human figure in hardwood inspired by African sculpture
 Christian Thomsen (1860–1921), influential role in producing porcelain figures
 Bertel Thorvaldsen (c. 1770–1844), Neo-classical statues crafted mainly in Italy, Christ in Vor Frue Kirke 
 Elisabeth Toubro (born 1956), renewal of Danish sculpture with emphasis on Greenland
 Kurt Trampedach (1943–2013), mainly a painter

U
 Einar Utzon-Frank (1888–1955), many classical works for public monuments in the Thorvaldsen style

V
Hanne Varming (born 1939), sculptor and medallist

W
 Olga Wagner (1873–1963), stone and bronze statues, porcelain figures
 Gunnar Westman (1915–1985), stylized figures, often of children
 Johannes Wiedewelt (1731–1802), Neo-classical works for the Danish court including memorial monument of Christian VI
 Svend Wiig Hansen  (1922–1997), Mennesket ved havet near Esbjerg
 Jens Ferdinand Willumsen (1863–1958), versatile artists also practicing sculpture

See also
 List of Danish painters

 
Sculptors
Danish sculptors